The Interstate Highways in Missouri are the segments of the national Dwight D. Eisenhower System of Interstate and Defense Highways that are owned and maintained by the U.S. state of Missouri.


Primary Interstates

Auxiliary Interstates

Business routes

See also

References

External links

 
Interstate Highways